Senator Hillard may refer to:

George Stillman Hillard (1808–1879), Massachusetts State Senate
Major M. Hillard (1896–1977), Virginia State Senate

See also
Earl Hilliard (born 1942), Alabama State Senate
Lyle W. Hillyard (born 1940), Utah State Senate